USS Oswald (DE-767) was a  inb service with the United States Navy from 1944 to 1946. She was sold for scrapping in 1973.

Namesake
Harvey Emerson Oswald was born on 11 September 1918 in Columbus, Ohio. He enlisted in the U.S. Naval Reserve in April 1938. Discharged from the reserve at his own request on 3 August 1939, he enlisted in the U. S. Navy the same day. During the Japanese attack on Darwin, Australia, on 19 February 1942 he manned a .50 caliber machine gun on a PBY Catalina airplane to fire on the Japanese and was killed in the attack. He was posthumously awarded the Silver Star.

History
She was laid down on 1 April 1943 at the Tampa Shipbuilding Co., Tampa, Florida; launched on 25 April 1944; sponsored by Mrs. Zola F. Oswald, mother of the ship's namesake; and commissioned on 12 June 1944.

Following a Bermuda shakedown, Oswald sailed north to Boston, Massachusetts, thence to New York City where she reported for duty with CortDiv 22 in TG 21.5. On 19 August she sailed with Convoy CU-36 on her first transatlantic convoy escort mission. Off Northern Ireland, on 30 August, she hunted unsuccessfully for an enemy submarine after the loss of the tanker . Rejoining the convoy, the escort vessel saw the remainder of her charges into Derry, and on 4 September began the voyage back to New York. During the next eight months, she escorted ten additional convoys across the North Atlantic without a loss.

In October, she returned to New York, underwent pre-inactivation overhaul, and then sailed south again. Arriving at Green Cove Springs, Florida, on 9 November, she decommissioned there on 30 April 1946 and joined the Atlantic Reserve Fleet. Transferred to the Reserve Group at Philadelphia, Pennsylvania, in 1951, she remained in reserve until she was sold for scrapping on 15 October 1973.

References

External links

 
 

Cannon-class destroyer escorts of the United States Navy
Ships built in Tampa, Florida
1944 ships
World War II frigates and destroyer escorts of the United States